Baron Whitworth was a title that was created twice in the Peerage of Ireland. The first creation came in 1721 when Charles Whitworth was made Baron Whitworth, of Galway. He was childless and the title became extinct on his death in 1725. The second creation came in 1800 when Sir Charles Whitworth was made Baron Whitworth, of Newport Pratt in the County of Mayo. He was the son of Sir Charles Whitworth, nephew and namesake of the first Baron of the 1721 creation. For more information on the second creation, see Charles Whitworth, 1st Earl Whitworth.

Barons Whitworth; First creation (1721)
Charles Whitworth, 1st Baron Whitworth (1675–1725)

Barons Whitworth; Second creation (1800)
see Charles Whitworth, 1st Earl Whitworth

References

Extinct baronies in the Peerage of Ireland
1721 establishments in Ireland
1725 disestablishments in Ireland
1800 establishments in Ireland
1825 disestablishments in Ireland
Noble titles created in 1721
Noble titles created in 1800